Phaenarete (Greek Φαιναρέτη), wife of Sophroniscus, was the mother of the Greek philosopher Socrates and his half-brother, Patrocles.  (Since Sophroniscus had died before 424 BC, he was probably Phaenarete's first husband, while Chaeredemus, father of Patrocles, was her second.) The name Phaenarete means "She who brings virtue to light". And it is, according to A.E. Taylor, "suggestive of good family connexions", based on its appearance in the genealogy of the immortal Amphitheus in Aristophanes' Acharnians.

Very little is known of the life of Phaenarete. In Plato's Theaetetus, Socrates compares his own work as a philosopher with hers as a maia (midwife).  According to John Burnet, the role of maia was "performed by women of good family, and the translation 'midwife' is quite misleading."

References

Ancient Athenian women
5th-century BC Greek people
Family of Socrates
Greek midwives
5th-century BC Greek women